Zephyrhills is a city in Pasco County, Florida, United States. The population was counted at 17,194 in the 2020 census. It is a suburb of the Tampa Bay Metropolitan Statistical Area. Zephyrhills is also known as the headquarters of the Zephyrhills bottled water company and is a member of Tree City USA.

History
Zephyrhills began as the town of Abbott on April 18, 1888, and consisted of 280.74 acres. A voting district was established in 1893 followed by a post office in 1896. In 1909, Captain Howard B. Jeffries, a Civil War Union veteran from Pennsylvania, purchased 35,000 acres and created the Zephyrhills Colony Company with a plan to create a community for Civil War veterans. In 1910 the town voted to change its name to Zephyrhills; it was incorporated in 1914.

In 1941, one resident reported that Zephyrhills had a sundown town policy forbidding African Americans from living within the city limits.
 
The city created a historic district in 1999; in 2001 the Zephyrhills Historic District was nominated for and listed on the National Register of Historic Places. A Founders Day celebration is held annually in March.

Geography
Zephyrhills is known for its rolling topography, hence the name.

Climate 
The climate in this area is characterized by hot, humid summers and warm, generally dry winters. According to the Köppen Climate Classification system, Zephyrhills has a humid subtropical climate, abbreviated "Cfa" on climate maps.

Demographics

As of the 2020 United States census, there were 17,194 people, 7,178 households, and 4,174 families residing in the city.

Of the total population, 4.4% were under 5 years old, 18.1% were under 18 years old, and 35.7% were 65 years and over. 54.9% of the population were female. There were 1,548 veterans living in the city and 8.0% were foreign born persons.

89.8% of households had a computer and 81.6% of households had a broadband internet subscription.

18.1% of the population under the age of 65 lived with a disability and 20.1% of that same population did not have health insurance.

The median household income was $36,799 and the per capita income was $21,848. 17.8% of the population lived below the poverty threshold.

Arts and culture

The Zephyrhills Public Library was founded in 1912. According to the city's website, "The Library provides open and equal access to the resources and services of the library. The Library seeks to encourage reading and the use of technology for life-long learning and the enhancement of the community's quality of life." Library personnel also staff the city's Depot Museum. The library is managed by a Library Advisory Board and is a member of the Pasco County Library Cooperative. A new library was built in 2014 just north of the old library.

The Zephyrhills Depot Museum originated with the 1989 purchase of the 1927 Atlantic Coast Line Depot from CSX Railroad by the City of Zephyrhills. Restoration of the  building began in 1997 with a Grant from the State Department of Transportation. The Historical Preservation Committee and the Zephyrhills Historical Association worked together to complete the restoration. The Zephyrhills Depot Museum opened on October 20, 1998.

Infrastructure

Transport

Major roads

  U.S. Route 301 (Fort King Highway/Gall Boulevard) is the main road through Zephyrhills running north and south through the city.
  State Road 39 (Paul S. Buchman Highway/Gall Boulevard) runs northwest and southeast from Plant City into US 301 in Zephyrhills, and joins US 301 as a "hidden state road".
  County Road 41 (Fort King Highway/Fort King Road) is an extension of SR 41, which is a hidden state road along US 301 from the Hillsborough County Line.
  State Road 54 (Fifth Avenue) is the main east–west road that runs through southern Pasco County, from US 19 near Holiday to US 301 in Zephyrhills. A County extension (CR 54/Eiland Boulevard) from the intersection of SR 54 and CR 579 to U.S. Route 98 in Branchborough also exists, and a western extension to CR 577 in Wesley Chapel is planned for construction.
  State Road 56 is a 2002-built road between SR 54 and runs to US 301 south of Zephyrhills.
  County Road 579 (Morris Bridge Road/Eiland Boulevard/Handcart Road) is a bi-county extension of State Road 579 that runs from northern Tampa, through the western edge of the city, to west of Dade City. County Road 54 overlaps CR 579 north of SR 54 until it branches off to the east.
  County Road 535 (Chancey Road/Old Lakeland Highway) runs along the southern and eastern edge of the city and north into County Road 35 Alternate in Vitis

Public transportation
Zephyrhills is served by Pasco County Public Transportation on routes #30, #33, and #54.

Airport
The city is served by Zephyrhills Municipal Airport. It was also once served by the 1927-built Zephyrhills Depot on the Atlantic Coast Line, which is now the Zephyrhills Depot Museum at a city park near the airport. More than 70,000 skydives are performed annually on the airport at Skydive City, Inc., the largest woman-owned drop zone in the world, founded in 1990 by Joannie Murphy and Susan Perkins Stark.

Railroads 
CSX Transportation's Wildwood Subdivision goes through the eastern parts of Zephyrhills.

Public safety
The Zephyrhills Police Department consists of about 35 officers. The Zephyrhills Fire Department consists of career and volunteer firefighters.

Notable people
Domonic Brown, baseball player
 Dave Eiland, former Major League Baseball pitcher
 Bobby Geudert, soccer player (died in Zephyrhills)
 Prince Iaukea, pro wrestler (born Michael Hayner)
 Ramiele Malubay, American Idol finalist (attended Zephyrhills High School until 2002)
 Jessica Meuse, American Idol finalist, briefly lived in Zephyrhills
 Tracy Negoshian, fashion designer
 Stephen Perry, writer for the animated series ThunderCats and Silverhawks
 Ryan Pickett, defensive tackle for the Green Bay Packers, graduated from Zephyrhills High School in 1998 
 Buzzie Reutimann, race car driver
 David Reutimann, NASCAR Sprint Cup Series driver
 Carl Tanzler (aka Carl von Cosel), person who stole and preserved the corpse of Elena Milagro Hoyos

References

Further reading

External links

 City of Zephyrhills official website
 History of Zephyrhills

Cities in Pasco County, Florida
Cities in the Tampa Bay area
1910 establishments in Florida
Cities in Florida
Sundown towns in Florida